Henryk Ostrowski (13 December 1960 – 18 January 2021) was a Polish politician and farmer who served as a Member of the Sejm in the years 2001–2005.

References

1960 births
2021 deaths
Polish politicians